The Mount Pleasant Indian Industrial Boarding School in Mt. Pleasant, Michigan, was  established by an act of the United States Congress in 1891. This provided funding for creation of an education system of off-reservation boarding schools and vocational training centers to educate Native American children. It was extending a model developed and practiced first at the Carlisle Indian Industrial School, which opened in 1879 and was directed by Richard Henry Pratt, an Army officer.

Beginnings

The cornerstone of the first of eleven buildings that would make up the boarding school's campus was placed in front of a crowd of more than 2,000 people from across the state on October 18, 1892. As part of the crowd's celebration, they congregated in the town of Mount Pleasant, Michigan and paraded to the school grounds some distance away in farmland. The Grand Master of the Free and Accepted Masons was on hand to lead in the "ancient ritual" of laying the cornerstone. The Grand Chaplain led the crowd in a Christian prayer to bless the school and all those that would reside there.

What then was known at the Mount Pleasant Indian Industrial Boarding School started as a small school authorized by the federal government and operated by a mission of the United Methodist Church. It had previously been known as the "farm school", as it was developed in the middle of farmland outside of Mount Pleasant. Located in Isabella County, it was near the Isabella Indian Reservation of the federally recognized Saginaw Chippewa Tribal Nation.

Buildings and grounds

In 1892, construction began of the first school building of the new school dedicated to educating Native American children. October 18, 1892, dedication ceremonies for the main building took place and on January 3, 1893, the eight-classroom building opened to the first seventeen students. By June 1893, enrollment had increased significantly. In the coming years, the school expanded, building additional structures to accommodate all of the students and their daily activities. 

There were separate boys and girls dormitories, a hospital, a woodworking and blacksmith shop; a building for industrial training, a dining hall, a clubhouse for employees of the school, and several farm buildings. In 1910 the school built a new gymnasium. Adjacent to the school was an "Indian Cemetery", which is still visible today.

The children

Native American children from all over the State of Michigan, along with children from Alaska, Minnesota, Wisconsin, and New York came to the Mount Pleasant Indian Industrial Boarding School. It had an average enrollment of more than 300 students annually for many of the years it was open.

School is in session

The Native American children at the boarding school received basic academic instruction in grades kindergarten through eighth (K-8) at the Mount Pleasant School. The strict and structured schedule was focused on vocational training and religious education. Classes were offered in English language, woodworking, farming, sewing/tailoring, laundry, housekeeping and basic first aid. The coursework included teaching students how to adapt and fit into "white culture". Rumors of extreme abuse suffered by students as told by locals permeate the locale. The documentary film Indian School: Stories of Survival includes interviews with attendees of the Mount Pleasant Indian Industrial Boarding School and some of their descendants. The Saginaw Chippewa Tribe maintains a YouTube channel documenting remembrance ceremonies for the students who attended and died there.

Mount Pleasant Branch of the Michigan Home and Training School

Classes for the Native American children at the school continued until the school closed on June 6, 1934. The property was transferred by the federal government to the State of Michigan for use by the Michigan Department of Mental Health services. 

After that, it was called The Mount Pleasant Branch of the Michigan Home and Training School. The intent of this home and training school was to house and train mentally handicapped young men. Many of the boys were abandoned; some were juvenile criminals who did not understand their crime or charges in court, and even more of the residents were mentally or physically handicapped. A majority of the residents had some kind of mental health issue.

Closure

The facility closed in 2008; the State of Michigan made the decision to close due to budget shortfalls at the state level and a dwindling number of patients being assisted at the location. Since their closure, the buildings have lain empty and abandoned. Today, the majority of the buildings' windows and doors are broken or boarded over and the buildings lie in disrepair. The interiors of the buildings are filled with old and used furniture, unused medical supplies, trash, and anything that was left behind by the staff. Much of the appearance of the interior is due to years of neglect and after the closure, the complex was left abandoned and vacant, which left the buildings and grounds vulnerable to vandals.  It is now the property of the Saginaw Chippewa Tribal Nation. One plan is to make the former school a museum.

The property was listed on the National Register of Historic Places in 2018.

Images

See also
Carlisle Indian Industrial School
Bureau of Indian Affairs
Native American Boarding Schools
National Register of Historic Places listings in Isabella County, Michigan

References

External links
Saginaw Chippewa Indian Tribe - Official Tribal Website
Saginaw Chippewa Tribal College Website
Clarke Historical Library, Mt. Pleasant, MI
State of Michigan Department of Civil Rights and the Michigan Indian Tuition Waiver Program

Social history of the United States
Native American history of Michigan
Assimilation of indigenous peoples of North America
Native American boarding schools
National Register of Historic Places in Isabella County, Michigan